The court system of Niue is a three-tiered judicial system established by the Niue Constitution Act in the island nation of Niue. It consists of the High Court, which has original jurisdiction to hear all criminal, civil and land matters, the Court of Appeal, which has appellate civil and criminal jurisdiction, and the Privy Council in England. Justices interpret the law subject to the Constitution of Niue, and if they determine a law violates the Constitution then the Constitution takes precedence. A system of common law is used in the court system, and the Doctrine of Precedent ensures that lower courts follow the precedent of upper courts. The civil and criminal courts operate under an adversarial legal system, while the land courts operate under an inquisitive legal system.

High Court 
The High Court of Niue has original jurisdiction in criminal, civil, and land matters. The court is divided into three divisions; criminal division, civil division, and land division. Furthermore, it has three types of officials; Judges, Commissioners, and Justices of the Peace. The main difference between the three is jurisdiction. One other notable difference is the ability to become Chief Justice, which is only a judge's power, and that judges have rehearing powers.

Currently, the Chief Justice is Craig Coxhead. The Chief Justice is chosen by the Governor-General of New Zealand on advice from the cabinet of Niue. As of 2014, the judges are Judge Wilson Isaac, Judge Craig Coxhead and Judge Sarah Reeves. The Civil and Criminal Commissioners are Mr. Desmond Hipa, Mrs. Sifaole Ioane and Mrs. Taumalua Jackson. The Land Commissioners are Mrs. Rheumatic Alapaki, Mrs. Maihetoe Hekau, Mr. Robin Hekau, Mr. Hale Ikitule, Mrs. Leliviika Liumaihetau and Mr. Saukia Tukuitonga. The Justices of the Peace are Ms. Paese McMoore and Mrs. Francis Lui-Valiana.

Two Justices of the Peace must be present to exercise the same functions as one Commissioner. All three can not stay on past 68 years of age. Jurisdiction based on each specific case is outlined in the extensive table below.

Criminal Court 
In criminal trials, the idea of innocent until proven guilty applies, and the burden of proof is on the prosecution. In 2014, 109 criminal cases were filed and the average duration of a case was 54 days.

Criminal proceedings 
As the diagram on the right shows, there is a complex set of procedures in the Niue criminal court system.

Criminal jurisdiction and sentencing

Transport jurisdiction 

These tables describe traffic jurisdiction under the Niue Transport Act 1965 and its amendments. The shaded parts refer to a problem created by amendments to the Transport Act.

Civil Court and Jurisdiction 
One commissioner or 2 Justices of the Peace have the jurisdiction to hear a civil action for which the recovery of debt or damages does not exceed NZ $1500. However, in practice, judges are the ones that generally hear civil cases. In 2013–14, 22 civil cases were filed and the average duration of a case was 52 days.

Land Court and Jurisdiction 
Commissioners and Judges have jurisdiction in the Land Court. In 2013, 260 cases were filed, 150 were resolved, and the average duration of a case was 72 days. On the right is a diagram of the structure and proceedings of a case in the Land Court.

Court of Appeal 
The Court of Appeal is an appellate court that may hear appeals based on the High Court granting leave for cases of extraordinary importance, if the High Court certifies it relates to the interpretation of the constitution, or when the Court of Appeal grants special leave to appeal. In criminal jurisdiction, a person convicted of a criminal offence may appeal if they are sentenced to death, imprisonment for life, or to a fine or imprisonment that is not fixed by law. The Court of Appeal meets approximately every three years. Very few cases are appealed to the Court of Appeal, often less than 3 a year, and of those on average a very small amount are overturned.

The Sovereign in Council 
The Sovereign in Council is officially the highest court in Niue. It is the King of the United Kingdom, acting by and with the advice of the Judicial Committee of the Privy Council. Appeals may be made by the aggrieved party from the Court of Appeal, and it is up to His Majesty's discretion whether to accept the case. This function is in reality one of the Judicial Committee of the Privy Council, which is the highest court in the Niue court system. The Judicial Committee has not yet heard a case from Niue, although they have heard many cases from the nearby Cook Islands.

References 

Politics of Niue
Judiciaries by country